Yponomeuta sedella is a moth of the family Yponomeutidae. It is found in Europe.

The wingspan is 16–20 mm. The moth flies in two generations from May to September. .

The larvae feed on Hylotelephium telephium and other Sedum species.

Notes
The flight season refers to Belgium and the Netherlands. This may vary in other parts of the range.

External links
 waarneming.nl 
 Lepidoptera of Belgium
 Yponomeuta sedella at UKmoths

Yponomeutidae
Moths described in 1832
Moths of Asia
Moths of Europe
Moths of Japan
Taxa named by Georg Friedrich Treitschke